Charles Franklin Farwell,  (December 24, 1860 – March 26, 1921) was an Ontario lawyer and political figure. He represented Algoma East in the Legislative Assembly of Ontario as a Liberal member from 1894 to 1902.

He was born in East Whitby Township, Canada West (now Whitby, Ontario), the son of Charles Farwell, and educated in Oshawa. He studied law, was called to the Ontario bar and was later named King's Counsel. Farwell lived in Sault Ste. Marie. After his term in office, he was named Registrar for Algoma. Farwell also served as a Master in the local Masonic Lodge.

He died in 1921.

References

External links 
The Canadian parliamentary companion, 1897 JA Gemmill

The Story of Baw-a-ting, being the annals of Sault Sainte Marie, EH Capp

1860 births
1921 deaths
Ontario Liberal Party MPPs
People from Whitby, Ontario
Canadian King's Counsel